Woodhull Mountain is a mountain located in the Catskill Mountains of New York east-southeast of Frost Valley. Van Wyck Mountain is located east-northeast and Red Hill is located west-southwest of Woodhull Mountain.

Woodhull Mountain is in the Summits category for Ulster County in the state of New York. Woodhull Mountain is displayed on the Peekamoose Mountain USGS quad topo map.

References

Mountains of Ulster County, New York
Mountains of New York (state)